The Athens Naval Hospital is the largest Navy hospital in Greece. It is situated at the foothill of Lycabettus Hill, at Dinokratous 70 in Central Athens. Construction started in 1948, but it became operational in 1955, and was renovated and enlarged in 1995.

References 

Central Athens (regional unit)
Hospitals in Athens
Hospital buildings completed in 1955
Hospitals established in 1955
Hellenic Navy
1955 establishments in Greece